Rihaee is an Indian television crime series that aired on Sony TV, based on the real life crime stories against women. The series premiered on 9 February 2005, and is hosted by Kishwer Merchant & Rajeshwari Sachdev.

Cast
 Rucha Gujarathi as Shalini
 Sandeep Baswana as Rakesh

References

Sony Entertainment Television original programming
Indian crime television series